Renaissance University is a private university licensed by the Federal Government of Nigeria in 2005.
Its main campus is located in Ugbawka (Igbo: Ugbuoka) in Enugu State, Nigeria.

Location
Renaissance University is located in Ugbawka (off Enugu-Port Harcourt Express Road en route Ebonyi State) in Nkanu East Local Government Area of Enugu State in Igboland.

The campus can be reached within 30 minutes by road from the capital city of Enugu. It is about an hour drive from Abia State University (Uturu), Ebonyi State University (Abakaliki) and the University of Nigeria, Nsukka. The commercial cities of Aba and Port Harcourt are between two hours and two and a half hours drive away.

It is one of two universities located in Nkanuland of Enugu State. The other is the Enugu State University of Science and Technology (ESUT) - the first state university of technology in Nigeria, located at Agbani   in Nkanu West Local Government Area.

Colleges
The university has three colleges.

College of Natural and Applied Sciences
The College of Natural and Applied Sciences has five departments. They are Microbiology, Biochemistry, Industrial Chemistry, Computer Science and Industrial Physics.

College of Management and Social Sciences
The College of Management and Social Sciences has eight departments. They are Economics, Mass Communication, Industrial Business Administration, Accountancy, History & International Relations, Psychology, Political Science and Banking & Finance.

College of Law

References

External links
 Renaissance University official website

Universities and colleges in Nigeria
Educational institutions established in 2005
2005 establishments in Nigeria
Buildings and structures in Enugu State
Private universities and colleges in Nigeria